Liu Bin (Chinese: 刘斌; Pinyin: Liú Bīn; born 20 March 1991 in Jining) is a Chinese football player who currently plays for Dandong Tengyue F.C. in the China League Two.

Club career

Hangzhou Greentown 
Liu started his professional football career in 2009 when he was loaned to China League Two club Hangzhou Sanchao (Zhejiang Greentown Youth)  for one year. He was promoted to Hangzhou Greentown's first team squad by Wu Jingui in 2011. He made his debut for Hangzhou Greentown on 11 May 2011, in the last round of 2011 AFC Champions League group stage which Hangzhou tied with FC Seoul 1–1. On 14 July, he made his Super League debut in a 0–0 home draw against Beijing Guoan, coming on as a substitute for Jiao Zhe in the 78th minute. Liu became a regular starter as a right back after Takeshi Okada took over the club in 2012. He made 21 appearances in the 2012 season.

Shanghai Shenhua 
In December 2013, Chinese Super League side Shanghai Shenhua official announced that they had signed Liu Bin from Hangzhou Greentown.

In February 2014, Liu moved to China League One side Beijing Baxy on a one-year loan deal.

International career
Liu received his first called up into China U-22 in April 2012. He made his debut for the U-22s on 9 May, in a 2-2 friendly home draw against Malawi. He was included in the squad for 2013 AFC U-22 Asian Cup qualification held by Laos in June 2012. Shi made 4 appearances in the qualification as China U-22 qualified into the 2013 AFC U-22 Championship.

Career statistics 
Statistics accurate as of match played 31 December 2020.

References

External links
 

1991 births
Living people
People from Jining
Chinese footballers
Footballers from Shandong
Zhejiang Professional F.C. players
Shanghai Shenhua F.C. players
Beijing Sport University F.C. players
Chinese Super League players
China League One players
Association football defenders
Guangxi Pingguo Haliao F.C. players